The 2014–15 Cleveland State Vikings men's basketball team represented Cleveland State University in the 2014–15 NCAA Division I men's basketball season. Their head coach was Gary Waters in his ninth season. The Vikings played their home games at the Wolstein Center and were members of the Horizon League. It was the 84th season of Cleveland State basketball. They finished the season 19–15, 11–5 in Horizona League play to finish in a tie for third place. They advanced to the semifinals of the Horizon League tournament where they lost to Valparaiso. They were invited to the CollegeInsider.com Tournament where they defeated Western Michigan in the first round before losing in the second round to NJIT.

Roster

Preseason
Cleveland State was picked second in the Horizon League preseason poll, with nine first place votes.

Schedule

|-
!colspan=12 style="background:#003300; color:#FFFFFF;"| Exhibition

|-
!colspan=12 style="background:#003300; color:#FFFFFF;"| Regular season

|-
!colspan=12 style="background:#003300; color:#FFFFFF;"| Horizon League tournament

|-
!colspan=12 style="background:#003300; color:#FFFFFF;"| CIT

References

Cleveland State Vikings Men's
Cleveland State Vikings men's basketball seasons
Cleveland State
2014 in sports in Ohio
2015 in sports in Ohio